Super Blood Hockey is an ice hockey video game for Windows. The game was developed and published by Loren Lemcke in 2017. It was available in the Nintendo eShop for the Nintendo Switch in April 2019 with release dates from PlayStation 4 and Xbox One later in the year. The console versions included a new franchise mode, with the PC version receiving this mode as a free update. A limited physical release of the Switch version was released by Premium Edition Games.

Gameplay
Super Blood Hockey mainly focuses on the violent side of hockey. It contains overly exaggerated blood and violence giving it a "Mature" rating. It is heavily inspired by Nintendo Entertainment System game Ice Hockey, using many mechanics introduced in that game. It contains 8 playable countries.

Reception

Nintendo Life awarded Super Blood Hockey a score of 6 out of ten, saying 'Super Blood Hockey is an entertaining sports game, but not necessarily one that will hold your attention for very long.'

References

External links 
 Official Website

Windows games
2017 video games
Ice hockey video games
Multiplayer and single-player video games
PlayStation 4 games
Video games developed in Finland
Nintendo Switch games
2019 video games
Xbox One games